George Spaak (11 February 1877 - 25 February 1966) was a Swedish engineer.

Biography
George Spaak was born in Stockholm, Sweden.   He was the father of  physician Ragnar Spaak (1907-1979).   He was the  brother-in-law of Birger and Fredrik Ljungström.

Spaak graduated from  the department of electrical engineering at Royal Institute of Technology in 1897.  Around 1898–1902 he was employed at The Ljungström Engine Syndicate in Newcastle, United Kingdom, and made business travels in the United States and the German Empire. He was employed at the engineering agency of  Carl Wilhelm Bildt (1854-1906) in Stockholm 1902–1904, and at Bergvik och Ala Nya Aktiebolag 1904–1944.

Spaak was one of Sweden's first private  sports pilots with his own aeroplane. He was a fellow of the 1931 Flight Technical Committee of the Royal Swedish Academy of Engineering Sciences 1924–1943 and responsible for aerial security in Söderhamn. He was a member of the municipality of Söderala 1919–1931.  He died at Söderhamn in 1966.

Works
 Männen kring Carl Daniel Ekman och tillkomsten av världens första sulfitcellulosafabrik ( (Stockholm: Svenska Cellulosa- och Trämasseföreningarna. 1957)

Distinctions
 : Knight of the Order of the Polar Star
 : Knight of the Order of Vasa
 : Fellow of the Flight Technical Committee of the Royal Swedish Academy of Engineering Sciences

References

Other sources
Vem är vem, Norrlandsdelen, 1950, sid. 349.

External links
 Ingvar Oremark : George Spaak – en Bergviksprofil, Bergvik Nu. March 2006 sid.4, sid. 5

Swedish electrical engineers
Municipal commissioners of Sweden
1877 births
1966 deaths
KTH Royal Institute of Technology alumni
19th-century Swedish engineers
20th-century Swedish engineers
19th-century Swedish politicians
20th-century Swedish politicians
Knights of the Order of Vasa
Knights of the Order of the Polar Star